The Yugoslavia national handball team was the national handball team of Yugoslavia. It was organized by the Handball Federation of Yugoslavia.

Accomplishments

Summer Olympics

World Championship

Player statistics

Most appearances
100+

Top scorers
300+

Squads

Succeeding national teams

Former national handball teams
Hand
Nat